Michael Edward Gil Eigenmann (born May 24, 1960), known professionally as Michael de Mesa, is a Filipino film and television actor, and director.

Early life
Born as Michael Edward Gil Eigenmann to performer Eddie Mesa and actress Rosemarie Gil, he and his siblings, Mark and Cherie, grew up steeped in the arts. He is the uncle of Gabby Eigenmann, Tim ″Sid Lucero″ Eigenmann, Max Eigenmann, and Andi Eigenmann. De Mesa is of Swiss, Spanish, and Filipino descent.

Career
De Mesa began acting at age 16 in 1975 in Araw-araw, Gabi-gabi, and he remains active in film and television.

Since 2016, he appeared as Pat. Ramil "Manager" D. Taduran in ABS-CBN TV series, Ang Probinsyano while serving as one of the series' directors.

Personal life
De Mesa wed actress Gina Alajar in 1978. Their marriage lasted 23 years before they separated in 2001. Their marriage was annulled in 2006, but bore three children, all of whom are in show business: Ryan, Geoff, and AJ Eigenmann. He married Julie Reyes in September 2011. She is a dancer/choreographer from Hotlegs, Manila's premier jazz group.

Filmography

Films

Television

As director

Awards and nominations

See also
Andi Eigenmann
Gabby Eigenmann
Geoff Eigenmann
Mark Gil
Ryan Eigenmann
Sid Lucero

References

External links
 

1960 births
Living people
20th-century Filipino male actors
21st-century Filipino male actors
ABS-CBN personalities
Michael
Filipino film directors
Filipino male child actors
Filipino male comedians
Filipino male film actors
Filipino male television actors
Filipino people of Kapampangan descent
Filipino people of Spanish descent
Filipino people of Swiss descent
GMA Network personalities
Male actors from Manila
TV5 (Philippine TV network) personalities